There are over 9000 Grade I listed buildings in England. This page is a list of these buildings in the county of Essex.

Basildon

|}

Braintree

|}

Brentwood

|}

Castle Point

|}

Chelmsford

|}

Colchester

|}

Epping Forest

|}

Harlow

|}

Maldon

|}

Rochford

|}

Southend-on-Sea

|}

Tendring

|}

Thurrock

|}

Uttlesford

|}

See also
 :Category:Grade I listed buildings in Essex
Grade II* listed buildings in Essex

Notes

External links 
English Heritage Images of England

 
Essex